The National Court is a special high court in Iceland established in 1905 to handle cases where members of the Cabinet are suspected of criminal behaviour.

Composition
The National Court has 15 members: five Supreme Court justices, the Reykjavík District Court President, a professor of constitutional law at the University of Iceland and eight people chosen by the Parliament every six years.

Assembly
The court assembled for the first time in 2011, to prosecute former Prime Minister Geir Haarde for alleged gross misconduct in the events leading up to the 2008–2011 Icelandic financial crisis. On September 28, 2010, the Parliament decided, by 33 votes to 30, to charge Haarde.  Originally faced with six charges, he was convicted only on one that was considered to be a minor one.

See also
Labour Court
Cour de Justice de la République

References

1905 establishments in Iceland
Courts in Iceland
Organizations established in 1905